The Agon Kiriyama Cup (阿含･桐山杯) is a Go competition.

Outline
The Agon Kiriyama Cup is a Go competition endorsed by the Nihon Kiin. It was started in 1994 by Agon Shu. The name was originally the "Acom Cup" but it changed its sponsor in 1999 and became the Agon Kiriyama Cup. It is a single knockout tournament, but unlike the big titles in Japan, the title holder does not wait for a challenger, hence the difficulty of defending the title. The prize for the winner is 10,000,000 yen, a larger prize than some of the top-seven major titles.

The tournament has a counterpart in China, the Ahan Tongshan Cup; the winners of the two tournaments face off in the China-Japan Agon Cup.

Past winners

See also 

 Go competitions
 International Go Federation
 List of professional Go tournaments

References

External links
 Agon Cup

Go competitions in Japan